Sandvinvatnet is a lake in Ullensvang Municipality in Vestland county, Norway.  The  lake lies on the southern edge of the town of Odda. The Buardalen valley and Buarbreen glacier lie to the west of the lake. The Norwegian National Road 13 runs along the east side of the lake. The lake water flows north into the short river Opo, before entering the Sørfjorden.

See also
List of lakes in Norway

References

Lakes of Vestland
Ullensvang